Marcus Vinícius Simões Freire (born 6 December 1962) is a Brazilian sports official and retired volleyball player. He won a gold medal at the 1983 Pan American Games and a silver at the 1984 Olympics. After retiring from competitions he became a sports functionary. He is the current Executive Director of the Brazilian Olympic Committee and a Chef de Mission of the Brazilian team at the 2016 Summer Olympics.

References

1962 births
Living people
Brazilian men's volleyball players
Olympic volleyball players of Brazil
Volleyball players at the 1984 Summer Olympics
Olympic silver medalists for Brazil
Olympic medalists in volleyball
Medalists at the 1984 Summer Olympics
Pan American Games medalists in volleyball
Pan American Games gold medalists for Brazil
Volleyball players at the 1983 Pan American Games
Medalists at the 1983 Pan American Games